Ross Alexander Dykes (26 February 1945 – 30 November 2020) was a New Zealand cricketer who played 31 first-class matches for Auckland in the Plunket Shield between 1967 and 1977. A wicketkeeper and left-handed batsman, he made 81 dismissals and scored 723 runs.

Dykes continued to serve cricket, becoming a New Zealand selector for 13 years, then chief executive of the Otago Cricket Association for 10 years, retiring in 2015.  A major achievement of his tenure was the  development of University Oval in Dunedin as New Zealand's seventh Test ground.

Dykes died in Auckland on 30 November 2020, aged 75.

See also
 List of Auckland representative cricketers

References

External links 
 
 

1945 births
2020 deaths
New Zealand cricketers
New Zealand cricket administrators
Auckland cricketers
Wicket-keepers